Caloptilia tricolor is a moth of the family Gracillariidae. It is known from Fujian, China.

References

tricolor
Moths of Asia
Moths described in 1990